Akeley is a village and civil parish in north-west Buckinghamshire, England. The 2011 Census recorded the population of the parish as 514, down from 545 at the 2001 Census.

Village background
The village name is derived from the Old English for "Oak Field".  The Domesday Book of 1086 recorded it as Achelei.

The village was controlled by the Cluniac priory of nearby Newton Longville on behalf of the priory of Saint Faith in Longueville in northern France. The parish church of St. James the Apostle was built in Akeley in 1154. It was rebuilt to designs by the Gothic Revival architect John Tarring in 1854 and restored in 1901. By the mid 20th century St. James' had fallen into disrepair and in 1982 it was demolished. Akeley presently does not have its own parish church; it is part of the North Buckingham ecclesiastical parish.

Akeley once had a medieval deer park, and a school where poor children were taught to make lace.

Amenities
The village is a small primary school St James Church of England School, and outside the village the large Cognita run private Akeley Wood School.

The village has a pub (Bull & Butcher) and opened a new village hall in 2006.

Akeley hosts an annual horticultural show, which has been run since 1976.

Stockholt 
The ancient hamlet of Stockholt once lay within the parish boundary. It has been amalgamated with the modern village.

References

Sources

External links

 North Buckingham Parish
 

Villages in Buckinghamshire
Civil parishes in Buckinghamshire